Andreas Klausen Helmersen (born 15 March 1998) is a Norwegian footballer who plays as a striker for Raufoss.

Career
After impressing during preseason Andreas Helmersen was promoted to the first team ahead of the 2015 Tippeligaen season.

Andreas Helmersen made his debut for Rosenborg starting in a 3-0 win in a cup game against Vuku in April 2015. On July 2 the same year he made his European debut coming on in a 2-0 win in the first qualifying round of the 2015–16 UEFA Europa League over Víkingur of the Faroe Islands.

In November 2015 Helmersen, alongside teammates John Hou Sæter and Sivert Solli, became the first players in Norwegian football history to having won the Under-16, Under-19 and the senior Norwegian Football Cup. Helmersen and Sæter having also won the Under-16 cup twice. Helmersen won the Under-16 Cup in 2013 and 2014 and then the Under-19 and the senior cup in 2015. Helmersen scored in both the Under-16 finals.

In February 2018, Helmersen signed a new three-year contract with Rosenborg. A few days later he went out on loan to Ranheim.

Career statistics

Honours

Club
 Rosenborg
Norwegian Premier League (1): 2017
Norwegian Football Cup (2): 2015, 2016
Norwegian U-19 Championship (1): 2015
Norwegian U-16 Championship (2): 2013, 2014

References

External links
 Andreas Helmersen at NFF
 Andreas Helmersen at Odds BK

1998 births
Living people
Norwegian footballers
Rosenborg BK players
Ranheim Fotball players
Odds BK players
Eliteserien players
Association football midfielders
Footballers from Trondheim